Ogden is a planned and approved CTrain light rail station in Calgary, Alberta, Canada part of the Green Line. Construction will begin in 2022 and complete in 2027 as part of construction stage one, segment one. The station is located in the community of Ogden.   

Ogden station will be located near the intersection of Ogden Road and 72 Avenue SE near a primarily low-density residential and commercial area. The station is also near the Canadian Pacific Railway headquarters. A transit plaza will serve as the gateway to the station, which will become the new heart of the community and will include a mix of shops, services and housing.

References 

CTrain stations
Railway stations scheduled to open in 2027